Okyay is a Turkish surname. Notable people with the surname include:

 Ibrahim Okyay (born 1969), Turkish auto racing driver
 Kemal Okyay (born 1985), Turkish footballer
 Sevin Okyay (born 1942), Turkish literary critic, journalist, and author
 Turgut Okyay (born 1941), Turkish judge and politician

Turkish-language surnames